Antonio de Saliba, or Antonello de Saliba or Resaliba, (c.1466-c.1535) was an Italian painter of the Renaissance period, mainly active in Sicily and Calabria.

Born around 1466, Antonello de Saliba was the son of Giovanni Resaliba, woodcarver of possible Maltese descent who was married to Antonello da Messina's sister, whose name is not known. He was apprenticed to his cousin, Jacobello da Messina, for four years in 1480, with whom he probably travelled to Venice where Antonio stayed until the mid-1490s where he was for an unknown period of time affiliated probably as assistant in the workshop of Giovanni Bellini together with his brother Pietro de Saliba. Following this Venetian sojourn, Antonio returned to Messina where he set up his workshop that produced altarpieces, gonfaloni, painted crucifixes and other paintings for Eastern Sicilian, Calabrian and Maltese patrons. Surviving paintings and transcribed and published documents reveal that Antonio de Saliba's workshop was active from 1497 until 1534.

His paintings can be found in and around the Veneto, Eastern Sicily, Malta, Calabria, but also in important collections in major museums, such as the Metropolitan Museum of Art in New York, the Gallerie dell'Accademia in Venice, and the Victoria and Albert Museum in London.

References
Francesco Abbate, History of Art in Southern Italy: The Sixteenth Century, 2001 
Charlene Vella, "Three recently restored Renaissance paintings by Antonio De Saliba in Malta", At Home in Art: Essays in Honour of Mario Buhagiar, Charlene Vella (ed.), 2016, pp. 47–65.
Charlene Vella, "In the Footsteps of Antonello da Messina: The Antonelliani in Sicily and Venice in the Late Fifteenth and Early Sixteenth Centuries", PhD Dissertation, University of Warwick, 2015
Charlene Vella, "A Renaissance painter’s Malta connection", Sunday Times of Malta, 21 April 2013.   
Charlene Vella, "Early Renaissance painting from Żejtun rediscovered", Sunday Times of Malta, 19 June 2011.

External links
Italian Paintings, Venetian School, a collection catalog containing information about the artist and his works (see index; plate 3).

1466 births
1535 deaths
16th-century Italian painters
15th-century Italian painters
Italian male painters